Frank Sivero (born Francesco Lo Giudice; January 6, 1952) is an Italian-American actor. He is perhaps best known for playing the roles of Genco Abbandando in Francis Ford Coppola's The Godfather Part II, and Frankie Carbone (based on Angelo Sepe) in Martin Scorsese's Goodfellas.

Early life
Sivero was born Francesco LoGiudice in Siculiana, Sicily, Italy, and raised in Brooklyn, New York.

Career
Sivero, can be seen in The Godfather Part II, as Genco Abbandando. He also played Frankie Carbone in Goodfellas. He also appeared in The Wedding Singer with Adam Sandler.

The Simpsons lawsuit
In October 2014, Sivero initiated a $250 million lawsuit against Fox Television Studios.  The lawsuit alleged that in 1989 Sivero was living next door to writers from The Simpsons and the writers knew he was working on his Goodfellas character.  It alleged that the writers "were aware that the entire character of 'Frankie Carbone' was created and developed by Sivero, who based this character on his own personality."  A short time later, a character named Louie began appearing on The Simpsons. Louie was described as a mafioso character, second in command to Fat Tony, and similar in appearance and mannerisms to Sivero, and Sivero alleged that his "likeness [was] being infringed in violation of California's publicity rights law." The case was dismissed in August 2015, with the judge asserting that the character Louie was a parody of several Mob characters.

Filmography

The Godfather (1972) - extra in the Sonny beats Carlo scene (uncredited)
Shamus (1973) - Bookie
The Gambler (1974) - Donny's driver
The Godfather Part II (1974) - Genco Abbandando
New York, New York (1977) - Eddie DiMuzio
The Billion Dollar Hobo (1977) - Ernie
Fyre (1979) - Pickpocket
Sunnyside (1979) - Dezi
Going Ape! (1981) - Bad Habit
Fighting Back (1982) - Frank Russo
Blood Feud (1983) - Anthony Russo
Fear City (1984) - Mobster #2
The Ratings Game (1984) - Bruno
Ruthless People (1986) - Mugger
52 Pick-Up (1986) - Vendor
The Galucci Brothers (1987) - Frankie
Crossing the Mob (1988) - Frank
Goodfellas (1990) - Frank Carbone
Cop and a Half (1993) - Chu
Fist of Honor (1993) - Frankie Pop
Painted Desert (1993) - Johnny
Possessed by the Night (1994) - Murray Dunlap
Dumb Luck in Vegas (1997) - Snake
The Wedding Singer (1998) - Andy
Urban Relics (1998) - Tommy Two-Lips
Foolish (1999) - Giovanni
Mariah#1's (1999) - Henchman (segment "Honey")
Carlo's Wake (1999) - Uncle Leo
Little Nicky (2000) - Alumni Hall Announcer
Truth Be Told (2002) - LaTrenta
The Aviator (2004) - Photographer (uncredited)
Eddie Monroe (2006) - Angelo
Shortcut to Happiness (2007) - Luigi
Ring of Death (2008) - Tommy Micelli
Hotel California (2008) - Sal

References

External links

1952 births
Living people
People from Siculiana
American male film actors
Italian male film actors
Actors from Sicily
American people of Italian descent
Male actors from New York City
People from Brooklyn